United Nations Security Council Resolution 226, adopted on October 14, 1966, after hearing complaints from the Democratic Republic of the Congo that the then Portuguese territory of Angola had become a base of operation for the foreign mercenaries interfering in the domestic affairs of the Democratic Republic of the Congo, the Council urged the government of Portugal not to allow foreign mercenaries to use Angola as a base of operation for interfering in the DR Congo. The Council also called upon all states to refrain or desist from intervening in the domestic affairs of the DRC.

The resolution was adopted unanimously.

See also
Colonial history of Angola
Congo Crisis
List of United Nations Security Council Resolutions 201 to 300 (1965–1971)
Portuguese Empire

References
Text of the Resolution at undocs.org

External links
 

 0226
 0226
 0226
 0226
Portuguese Angola
October 1966 events